Geser is a language of the east end of Seram and the Geser Islands, Indonesia.

External links

Central Maluku languages
Languages of Indonesia
Seram Island